Deran Sarafian  is an American film and television director and actor. He directed Death Warrant, Gunmen, and Terminal Velocity. He has been nominated for two Primetime Emmy Awards.

Life and career

Sarafian is the son of film director Richard C. Sarafian, and the nephew of director, screenwriter and producer Robert Altman. He is the brother of Ani Sarafian, Tedi Sarafian, Richard Sarafian, Jr. and Damon B. Sarafian. He has two children with ex-wife, actress Laurie Fortier.

In 1983 Sarafian said he had spent the previous five years "ghost directing", i.e. taking over films where the original director was unable to complete filming. These films included Young Warriors (1983).
 
After directing a number of genre movies in Spain and Italy, Sarafian entered into the mainstream by directing the Jean-Claude Van Damme action film Death Warrant. As a film director he has worked primarily in the action and thriller genres.

Sarafian has directed 23 episodes of the FOX series House and was made a co-executive producer of the series from 2007 and 2009. He was the producing director for several episodes of the first season of CSI: NY. Sarafian has also directed installments of: CSI: Crime Scene Investigation, CSI: Miami, Cold Case, The District, Without a Trace, Buffy the Vampire Slayer, Nash Bridges, Fringe, The Cape, Lost, Hell on Wheels, and Nikita.

Select filmography

Directing
The Falling (1986)
Interzone (1987)
To Die For (1989)
Death Warrant (1990)
Back in the USSR (1992)
Gunmen (1994)
The Road Killers (1994)
Terminal Velocity (1994)
Buffy the Vampire Slayer (1998) - Television | Season 2 Episode 18
Road Rage (1999) – Television film
Trapped (2001) – Television
House MD (2004) – Television
Lost (2006) – Television
Fringe (2010) – Television
The Cape (2011) – Television
Nikita (2012) – Television
Hemlock Grove (2013) – Television
The Strain (2014) – Television
Dominion (2015) – Television
Game of Silence (2015) – Television
Rosewood (2016) – Television
Wisdom of the Crowd (2017) - Television | Season 1 Episode 5
Blue Bloods (2018) - Television
The Gifted (2018) - Television | Season 2 Episode 17
Swamp Thing (2019) - Television 
Project Blue Book (2020) - Television

Acting
10 to Midnight (1983) as Dale Anders
Interzone (1987)
Zombie 3 (1988)
Gunmen (1994) as the Bishop

References

External links
 

American film directors
American people of Armenian descent
American television directors
American male actors
Ethnic Armenian male actors
Living people
Year of birth missing (living people)